Polish Copernicus Society of Naturalists is a Polish scientific society for natural sciences researchers.

History

The society was founded in 1875 in Lviv on the initiative of natural sciences researchers in Lviv under the leadership of Feliks Kreutz (geologist), Bronisław Radziszewski (chemist) and Julian Niedźwiedzki (mineralogist and geologist). The first president was Feliks Kreutz, professor of mineralogy at the Lviv University. The name of the Society commemorates Nicolaus Copernicus.

The Society is a non-profit organization. Its main aim is to promote research and achievements of natural sciences. The area of interest is mainly biology (including neuroscience), medicine, physics, chemistry, geography, geology (including speleology), meteorology and science education. The Society organizes scientific and popular scientific conferences, e.g. Brain Awareness Week (in Cracow and Szczecin), and the Biological Olympiad, a competition for Polish high school students. It publishes two journals - from 1876 'Kosmos. Problemy Nauk Biologicznych' (the title in English translation: Cosmos. Problems of Biological Sciences) and since 1882 - 'Wszechświat. Pismo Przyrodnicze' (the title in English: The Universe. Magazine of Nature).

The Main Board of the Society is located in Cracow. It has six local branches in Cracow, Łódź, Wrocław, Szczecin, Lublin and Rzeszów.

There are three sections:

 Section of Speleology - the section for scientific studies of Polish caves  (website of the section)
 Section of Biology Education - the section for didactics of biology
 Section of Human Biology - the interdisciplinary section for human biology, medicine and humanities  (website of the section)

Presidents of the Society

References

External links
 Polish Copernicus Society of Naturalists website
 The website of Szczecin Branch of Polish Copernicus Society of Naturalists
 The website of Section of Speleology
 The website of Section of Human Biology

Scientific societies based in Poland
Naturalist societies
1875 establishments in Poland
1875 establishments in Austria-Hungary
Organizations established in 1875